The First Polka is a 1979 West German drama film directed by Klaus Emmerich. It was entered into the 29th Berlin International Film Festival. It is an adaptation of The First Polka: A Novel by Horst Bienek.

Cast
 Maria Schell – Valeska Piontek
 Erland Josephson – Leo Maria Piontek
 Guido Wieland – Montag
 Ernst Stankovski – Wondrak – Anwalt
 Claus Theo Gärtner – Metzmacher – Feldwebel
 René Schell – Josef Piontek
 Marco Kröger – Andreas
 Miriam Geissler – Ulla
 Eva Maria Bauer – Tante Lucie
 Jan Biczycki – Erzpriester Pattas
 Marie Bardischewski – Wassermilka
 Regine Lamster – Irma
 Markus Stolberg – Leutnant Heiko
 Jessica Früh – Halina
 Ursula Strätz – Witwe Zoppas

References

External links

1979 films
1979 drama films
1970s German-language films
West German films
German drama films
Films about Nazi Germany
Films based on German novels
Films directed by Klaus Emmerich
Films set in 1939
1970s German films